Renegade or The Renegade may refer to:

Aircraft
Lake Renegade, an American amphibious aircraft design
Murphy Renegade, a Canadian ultralight biplane design
Southern Aeronautical Renegade, an American racing aircraft design

Games 
Command & Conquer: Renegade, a 2002 first-person shooter video game
Renegade (video game), a 1986 video game
Renegade Legion, a 1990 board game series including the video game Renegade: the Battle for Jacob's Star
Renegade Software, a games publisher of the 1990s
Jak II: Renegade, the second game in the Jak and Daxter series
Renegade points, a type of scoring/level system in the game series Mass Effect

Literature 
Renegade, a 1989 novel by Cordell Scotten in the Isaac Asimov's Robots and Aliens series
"The Renegade" (short story), a 1957 short story by Albert Camus
"The Renegade" (poem), a poem by David Diop

Music 
Renegade (band), an American rock band, also referred to throughout Latin America as Los Renegados

Albums
Renegade (Charlie Daniels album) or the title song, 1991
Renegade (HammerFall album) or the title song (see below), 2000
Renegade (Thin Lizzy album) or the title song, 1981
Renegade, by Dylan LeBlanc, 2019
Renegade, an EP by Alexandra Burke, 2015
Renegade, an EP by Cimorelli, 2014

Songs
"Renegade" (ATB song), 2007
"Renegade" (Big Red Machine song), 2021
"Renegade" (Daughtry song), 2011
"Renegade" (HammerFall song), 2000
"Renegade" (Jay-Z song), 2001
"Renegade" (Paramore song), 2011
"Renegade" (Styx song), 1979
"Lottery (Renegade)", by K Camp, 2019
"Renegade", by Axwell & Ingrosso from More Than You Know, 2017
"Renegade", by Bushido, 2019
"Renegade", by Carpark North from Phoenix, 2014
"Renegade", by Eva Simons, 2012
"Renegade", by Hed PE from New World Orphans, 2009
"Renegade", by Kavinsky from Reborn, 2022
"Renegade", by Kings of Convenience from Declaration of Dependence, 2009
"Renegade", by Manafest from The Chase, 2010
"Renegade", by the Paper Kites from Twelvefour, 2015
"Renegade", by the Qemists from Spirit in the System, 2010
"Renegade", by Running Wild from Death or Glory, 1989
"Renegade", by Steppenwolf from Steppenwolf 7, 1970
"Renegade", by Warren Zevon from Mr. Bad Example, 1991
"Renegade", by Wynter Gordon from With the Music I Die, 2011
"The Renegade", by the Pozo-Seco Singers, 1968

People
Ray Keith, jungle/drum-and-bass DJ and producer
Barack Obama, whose Secret Service code name is "Renegade"
The Renegade (wrestler), American professional wrestler

Television and film 
The Renegade (Spanish: La Renegada), a 1951 Cuban drama film
Renegade (TV series), produced by Stephen J. Cannell
Blueberry (film), a 2004 French movie released in the US as Renegade

Other 
The Dell XPS 600 Renegade, a model in the Dell XPS line of computers
Jeep Renegade (disambiguation), a nameplate used in several models sold by Jeep
Renegade (BBS), a bulletin board system written for IBM PC-compatible computers running MS-DOS
Renegade (roller coaster), a wooden roller coaster at Valleyfair in Shakopee, Minnesota
Renegade show, a frequent event at juggling conventions
Renegade (betrayer), a person who has betrayed and run away from his or her own kind
Renegade, the name used for Reversi in Clubhouse Games: 51 Worldwide Classics
Renegade Animation, an American animation studio located in Glendale, California

See also
Renegades (disambiguation)